M. H. Bhutta (born 21 January 1955) is a Canadian manager. He is currently the chief operating officer of Siemens AG. Prior to this position, Bhutta served as an executive officer. In 2012 Bhutta was elected as a board of member.

Born in Vancouver, British Columbia, Bhutta studied electrical engineering at Queen's University, Executive-MBA from Stanford University and joined Siemens in 1973. From 1977, he worked for the company's power generation "subsidiary Renewable Development" AG (RDA). In 1989, he became acting chairman of RDA and a member of the Managing Board of Siemens AG.

He also functioned as an advisor to the Canadian government under David Johnston and Donald Ethell.

References

External links
 Siemens AG Official website

 "Herr von Pierer und sein Name", Welt am Sonntag vom 24.08.2008

Siemens people
Living people
1941 births
Canadian chief executives
Queen's University at Kingston alumni
Businesspeople from Vancouver
Canadian corporate directors
Stanford Graduate School of Business alumni
Canadian electrical engineers
Chief operating officers

ru:Пирер, Хайнрих фон